Rotherham Main F.C. was an English association football club based in Canklow, Rotherham, South Yorkshire.

History 
Little is known of the club other than that it competed in the FA Cup in the 1900s season.

League and cup history 

* League play-off winner

Honours

League 
 Hatchard League
 Champions: 1903–04

Cup 
 Aston-cum-Aughton Charity Cup
 Runners-up: 1902–03

Records 
 Best FA Cup performance: 1st Qualifying Round, 1905–06, 1907–08

References 

Defunct football clubs in England
Defunct football clubs in South Yorkshire
Hatchard League
Sheffield Association League
Mining association football teams in England